Gambler's Gold is a 1911 Australian film based on the 1911 novel by Arthur Wright. It is considered a lost film.

Plot
The story revolved around a man innocently accused of murder. The film was divided into chapters:
The Home in a Garret.
A Dastardly Murder.
Foong Lee's Opium Den.
Great Motor Boat Chase in Sydney Harbour.

Cast
Casper Middleton as the villain
Ronald Conway as the hero
E.B. Russell as Ayr Arnold
Evelyn St Jermyn as Aileen Ayr, the heroine

Original novel

The film was based on a novel by Arthur Wright who specialised in stories about horse racing.
 The story had been first serialised in a newspaper in 1910 and published in novel form a year later. It was one of his most popular books.

Plot
Two men, good friends, love the same woman. One of the men is successful – a squatter. He marries the woman and they have a daughter. Then the squatter accidentally kills his wife by a blow meant for his friend. Over the years the old squatter is tormented by remorse; the friend falls in love with the squatter's daughter, although she is in love with one of her father's shearers.

Reception
A contemporary critic called the book a "wild and woolly farrago of delinquencies and stupidities. To'outline the "plot" is practically impossible. The story drifts from one absurdity to another. There seems to be no possibility of rational connection between the events: there is certainly no emotional sentiment, no principle, no characterisation, no redeeming feature whatever in the crude production."

Nonetheless film rights were sold early.

Production
The film was made by the short lived Australian Film Syndicate in North Sydney.

A sequence involved the Sydney Cup race. The AJC would not allow scenes to be shot at Randwick so the producer used Victoria Park. According to Wright:
It was decided to shoot tho Cup scene first. A grey — Fitz Merv, I think— won the handicap which was to represent the race for the Sydney Cup, after making a brilliant run in the straight from the rear of the field. This was a tiny stroke of luck for the producer who thereupon secured a grey horse to be used right through the picture, and when he was seen winning the Cup in the final scene the fans went crazy with delight. 
The cinematographer, George Wilkins, later became a noted polar explorer under the name "Hubert". He had become cinematographer for the Australian Film Syndicate after Lacey Percival left the company to join the Australian Photo-Play Company.

Reception
According to Wright the film "paid its way well... packed with action and thrills, [it] drew the crowds... If it could be shown to-day [in 1931] lecturer and all, no doubt it would be the laugh of a life time.".

A contemporary review said "the story abounds is dramatic situations, which culminate in a motor-boat chase down Sydney Harbour, the death of the villain, and a promise of future happiness for the lovers and their bright little son. All who appreciate a clean Australian story should welcome this excellent film."

References

External links
 
Gamblers Gold at AustLit
Gambler's Gold at National Archives of Australia
Newspaper articles on film and book at Trove
Complete story serialised in 1910 – 19 Feb, 26 Feb, 5 March, 12 March, 19 March, 26 March, 2 April, 9 April, 16 April, 23 April, 30 April, 7 May – final installment

Australian black-and-white films
Australian silent feature films
1911 films
Lost Australian films
Films based on Australian novels